FraudWatch International is an internet security organization that was founded in 2003 that mainly specializes in online fraud protection and anti-phishing activities. The headquarters of this privately owned company is in Melbourne, Australia and it has offices in London, Dubai and San Francisco. Its CEO is Trent Youl.

The activities of the company include anti-phishing, protection against malware and online brand protection, offering Security as a Service to other companies. Fraudwatch International is active in sponsoring and participating in congresses on cybercrime. It also sponsors the Anti-Phishing Working Group.

The techniques that are used by FraudWatch International include:

Anti-phishing techniques
Anti-vishing techniques
Anti-pharming techniques
Takedown of fake domains
Takedown of fake profiles on social media

References

External links
Official Website of FraudWatch International

Cybercrime
Confidence tricks
Identity theft
Organized crime activity
Social engineering (computer security)
Computer security organizations